Highway 11, known locally as the Abbotsford-Mission Highway, is a  long at-grade expressway (With the southernmost part of the highway two lanes) that figuratively cuts the Fraser Valley in half.  The highway was first given the '11' designation in 1958, and it originally followed South Fraser Way through Abbotsford, being re-routed onto the four-lane Sumas Way in the mid-1980s. Highway 11 originally entered Mission over the same bridge that carries a spur of the Canadian Pacific Railway across the Fraser River, but it was re-routed onto its own bridge, the Mission Bridge, in 1973.

Route details 
In the south, Highway 11 begins at the Huntingdon Canada–US border crossing, where it connects with Washington State Route 9. Highway 11 is facing west at this point, so it turns right onto its own dedicated route. It passes through the community of Matsqui and an interchange into Matsqui's centre, then crosses the Fraser River over the Mission Bridge into Mission, where it terminates at its junction with Highway 7.

History 

Highway 11 has been realigned several times since it was first designated in 1958. Until the Mission Bridge was completed in 1973, traffic crossing the Fraser River used a nearby railway bridge. Traffic continued to use Riverside Street until a new alignment and railway overhead was completed in 1979 or 1980. Once the highway crossed the Fraser, the highway turned towards Horne Street, along the present day Horne Street Connector. The current alignment opened in 1984 when a $6.7 million (equivalent to $16.42 million in 2022) route and overpass across the Canadian Pacific tracks opened. 
North from Abbotsford, the highway met Harris Road at a T-intersection and turned westwards, before turning north again at Riverside Street, continuing until it met the Trans-Canada Trail dyke at the Fraser River. Once over the bridge, the highway ran along Harbour Avenue and subsequently northwards along Horne Avenue towards the split Lougheed Highway.

In Abbotsford, both Gladys Avenue and Railway Avenue were both a part of the highway until the present expressway bypass was opened around late 1986 or early 1987.

The two interchanges on the north side and the CPR overhead were built after the Mission Bridge. The trumpet interchange leading to Horne Avenue was constructed before the CPR overhead, which was completed around 1984.
The interchange with London Avenue was completed in November 1998.

Major intersections 
For south to north. The entire route is in the Fraser Valley Regional District.

References

External links

 Official Numbered Routes in British Columbia

011
Mission, British Columbia
Transport in Abbotsford, British Columbia